Kottai Vaasal is a 1992 Indian Tamil-language action drama film directed by Selva Vinayagam. The film stars Arun Pandian, Sukanya, Saranya and Goundamani. It was released on 15 August 1992.

Plot

Cast 

Arun Pandian as father and son
Sukanya
Saranya as son Arun Pandian's mother
Goundamani
Chandrasekhar in friendly appearance
Mohan Natarajan as Periyavar
Rocky
Choudri
Krishnamurthy
Ponnambalam
Veeraraghavan
Ravishankar
Veerabathran
Pasi Narayanan
Dhideer Kannaiyah
C. Dhinakaran
Yuvasri
Premi
Mahima

Soundtrack 
Soundtrack was composed by Deva and lyrics written by Kalidasan.

Reception 
The Indian Express called the stormy "far-fetched", praising the performances of artists while calling Deva's music as "average".

References

External links 
 

1990s action drama films
1990s Tamil-language films
1992 films
Films scored by Deva (composer)
Indian action drama films